Fernando Tamayo Tamayo (13 February 1950 – 13 April 2018) was a Colombian economist and politician.

He was raised in Paipa and attended Jorge Tadeo Lozano University. Tamayo later taught at his alma mater and Del Rosario University. He was elected to the Paipa City Council between 1974 and 1980. He then moved to Bogotá, serving as councillor between 1982 and 1994. Tamayo contested his first House of Representatives election that year as a member of the Conservative Party. After four terms as a representative, he ran for Senate in 2010. Tamayo won reelection to the Senate in 2014, but was diagnosed with cancer in September 2016, and announced that he would not seek a third senatorial term. He died in Bogotá on 13 April 2018.

References

1950 births
2018 deaths
Deaths from cancer in Colombia
Colombian economists
Politicians from Bogotá
People from Paipa
Colombian Conservative Party politicians
Members of the Chamber of Representatives of Colombia
Members of the Senate of Colombia
Academic staff of Del Rosario University
Jorge Tadeo Lozano University alumni
Academic staff of Jorge Tadeo Lozano University
20th-century Colombian politicians
21st-century Colombian politicians